The Kakva is a river in Sverdlovsk Oblast, Russia. It is a right tributary of the Sosva (in the Ob's drainage basin). The river starts by the base of the Kavkinsky Stone on the eastern slopes of the Ural Mountains and flows eastwards to its confluence with the Sosva.

Along the river lies the town of Serov and the Kiselyovskoye Reservoir, upon which the small Kiselyovskaya Hydroelectric Plant is located. The reservoir was rebuilt after a catastrophic dam break in 1993, which caused major damage in Serov town.

Kakva translates as "pure water"

See also 
Kakvinskie Pechi

References 

Rivers of Sverdlovsk Oblast